Acianthera bibarbellata is a species of orchid plant native to Brazil.

References 

bibarbellata
Flora of Brazil
Plants described in 1908